"Mon rêve de toujours" (meaning "My Everlasting Dream") is the second single from Celine Dion's album Mélanie. It was released on 10 September 1984 in Quebec, Canada and also in France. The song entered the Quebec Singles Chart on 22 September 1984 and reached number 4, spending twenty one weeks on the chart. "Mon rêve de toujours" was also released as a single in France to promote Dion's second album in that country called Les oiseaux du bonheur. The song was also featured on the compilation Les premières années.

Track listings and formats
Canadian 7" single
"Mon rêve de toujours" – 4:17
"Chante-moi" – 3:21

French 7" single
"Mon rêve de toujours" – 4:20
"Les oiseaux du bonheur" – 3:40

Charts

References

1984 singles
1984 songs
Celine Dion songs
French-language songs
Pop ballads
Song recordings produced by Eddy Marnay
Songs written by Eddy Marnay